The Wingfoot Express was Walt Arfons and Tom Green's jet-powered land speed record car, driven by Green to a record on October 2, 1964, after Walt suffered a heart attack just prior. The Express was powered by a Westinghouse J46 engine and hit the 413 mph record mark.

History
At a trade fair in Gary, Indiana in 1962, Arfons met Green, chief engineer for a torque wrench manufacturer. Although Green's only racing experience had been a year of stock car racing in New Mexico ten years previously, he was greatly interested in aerodynamics; this dovetailed perfectly with Arfons' interest in racing mechanics, and "Within ten minutes we were planning our assault on the world's land speed record" Green recalls.

Green shortly provided plans for a three-wheeled land speed record car, which had to be changed to four wheels to meet FIA rules; from there on there was little change until the car was finished. Green's emphasis was on reducing aerodynamic drag by lowering the drag coefficient and, especially, reducing frontal area by narrowing the track and using smaller wheels.

In order to find funding, Arfons and Green approached Goodyear, who were already funding Craig Breedlove's Spirit of America. Although Spirit of America had a lower coefficient of drag, Green's design had a smaller frontal area and weighed slightly more than half as much. This, along with a thrust of 7,000 pounds force (31 kN) available from the J46 engine with afterburner, compared to only 4,400 pounds force (20 kN) available from Breedlove's J47 engine would make their design viable.

(In 1964 Bluebird CN7 demonstrated a final speed of over 440 mph, even when limited by poor surface conditions, invalidating Green's estimate.) However, although Spirit Of America had a $250,000 budget and Bluebird CN7 more than $2,000,000, Arfons and Green's car cost only $78,000.

Wingfoot Express' cockpit was located centrally, just behind the front axle, covered with an acrylic glass canopy from in front of the driver's feet to behind his head. The front wheels were mounted within the bodywork barely further apart than the width of the engine, while the rear wheels were on outriggers and exposed to the air. Green estimated that the aerodynamic drag of the exposed rear wheels cost the car , but since his calculations indicated that they already had much greater speed available than they needed, this was not viewed as a problem. A small fin rose vertically at the tip of the car's nose.

Only  of fence that had become entangled in her rear wheels stopped her", according to Green. Although the driver was unhurt "when Walt saw the Wingfoot heading for oblivion he had a heart attack on the spot" and was briefly hospitalized, but released himself in order to repair the car. In the process, he damaged the ligaments in one hand, eliminating whatever small chance remained of his driving the car for the record. At Bonneville, Green began his Land Speed Record career by easing the car around "the parking area" like any student driver. On his first timed run he hit , but "I hadn't fully anticipated that I'd have the feeling of rattling and banging down the black line like a rock in a can...the salt was a little rough....". "at  the upholstery of the seat hugged me like a pressure suit, at 275 [440 km/h] I had the weird feeling it was snowing in the cockpit!" The "snow" was flakes of salt which were being sucked into the cockpit by the vagaries of the aerodynamics; aside from being distracting, this brought up fears that the air pressure might crack or even completely shatter or remove the cockpit at speed. That run hit  before salt crystals drawn into the engine threw it off balance.

In 1964, Wingfoot Express returned to Bonneville for a week, but the engine never regained the strength shown in their earliest runs, and struggled to pick up speed. Even when another engine was installed, success eluded them. Finally, Walt's brother and longtime competitor Art Arfons, a brilliant intuitive mechanic for both piston and jet engines, suggested that the  opening of the "clamshells" on the engine exhaust was the problem. "it was a 1/16 turn of the idle adjustment on the engine and opening of the afterburner clamshells to  that brought the engine up to record performance", Green recalls. Green also removed some of the sheet metal around the engine intake, later realizing that in the process he had destroyed the Goodyear logo. But the Wingfoot Express now easily hit  with no afterburner. On the last day they had available, October 2, 1964, at 4:06 pm, a short blast of afterburner brought the car to a recorded , but the official record required the run be "backed up" in the opposite direction.

Within 3 days, however, the record had been reset by Art Arfons. Although the final record run had demonstrated that Wingfoot Express clearly had much more speed available, Green decided to not push his luck and retired from competition, returning to his regular job. He is today a vice president of the company, which used to produce torque wrenches for Snap-On. He continues to maintain contact with Arfons and they meet periodically. "I did offer to help Walt with his rocket car but the design was his own".

Walt Arfons went on alone to build Wingfoot Express 2 using solid-fuel rockets; peak power and acceleration was enormous, but could not be maintained long enough to set a record over the measured distance. Wingfoot Express 2 started with 10 JATO rocket bottles, and made an unofficial speed record of 605 mph with 25 JATO bottles in 1965.

Neither knows what happened to the original Wingfoot Express, or where it might now be.

References 

Jet land speed record cars
Goodyear Tire and Rubber Company